Coccotrypes dactyliperda, the date stone beetle, palm seed borer, or button beetle, is an insect belonging to the bark beetles (Scolytinae). It feeds on and spends part of its life cycle in dates, the fruits of the date palm (Phoenix dactylifera). Because of its damage to dates, it is considered a pest.

Distribution
Coccotrypes dactyliperda originates from Africa but has now a cosmopolitan distribution.

Description
Characteristic of beetles, they have four wings, with the pair of hardened forewings protecting the pair of hindwings used for flying. They chew a round hole into green unripe dates, causing the fruit to drop 1 or 2 days later.

Reproduction and life cycle
The species uses the haplodiploid sex-determination system: females are diploid while males are haploid; unmated females produce male offspring by parthenogenesis while mated females produce both male and female offspring. Both in beetles from collected date stones and in laboratory cultures, about 85–93% of the adults are females.

When a flying unfertilized female reaches a target such as a date stone, sweet almond, betel nut, nutmeg, cinnamon bark or a button made from vegetable ivory, hence the name "button beetle"), she bores a hole in it and excavates a chamber. (Males cannot penetrate the stone.) Inside, she produces a brood of four or five males. She mates with the first son that reaches maturity, then proceeds to eat them all. She then enlarges the chamber and lays a brood of about 70 offspring. Some of the females mate with their brothers.

It takes about 22–25 days for an egg to develop through a larva and pupa into an adult, with males developing faster than females. Mated females live on average 73 days while unmated ones live on average 63 days.

References

External links 
 Coccotrypes dactyliperda photographs

Scolytinae
Agricultural pest insects
Beetles of Africa
Beetles of Asia
Beetles of Central America
Beetles of Europe
Beetles of North America
Beetles of South America
Beetles described in 1801
Taxa named by Johan Christian Fabricius